Charles Bingham Penrose (October 6, 1798 – April 6, 1857) was a Pennsylvania attorney and politician.  He served as Speaker of the Pennsylvania Senate, Solicitor of the United States Treasury, and the first Assistant Secretary of the Treasury during President Zachary Taylor's administration.

Family and early life
Charles Bingham Penrose was born in Philadelphia, Pennsylvania on October 6, 1798 to a prominent Old Philadelphian family. His father, Clement Biddle Penrose, was Chairman of the Board of Land Commissioners for the Louisiana Territory under President Thomas Jefferson, and the neighborhood of Penrose, St. Louis is named in his honor. Penrose's mother, Anne Howard née Bingham, was a member of the Anglo-Irish branch of the Bingham family (see Earl of Lucan and Baron Clanmorris). His grandfather, Charles Bingham of Castlebar, Ireland, was a captain in the Volunteers of Ireland, a British Provincial military unit raised for Loyalist service during the American Revolutionary War. Bingham was divorced from Penrose's grandmother, Loyalist New Yorker Anna Howard, later Lady Hay through her second marriage to Sir Thomas Hay, 5th Baronet of Alderston. Penrose's mother was thus the half-sister of Sir James Douglas Hamilton Hay, the 6th baronet. Penrose's paternal grandmother, Sarah Biddle, was a member of the prominent Biddle family who, after the death of her first two husbands, went on to marry Bernese patrician Rudolph . His great-uncles included Clement Biddle, Owen Biddle Sr., and General James Wilkinson.

Penrose studied law and attained admission to the bar in 1821, afterwards establishing a practice in Carlisle. He married a cousin, Valeria Fullerton Biddle. She was a granddaughter of early American clergyman and patriot Elihu Spencer, niece of lawyer Jonathan Dickinson Sergeant, and grand-niece of 7th Vice-President of Pennsylvania Charles Biddle and his brothers Edward and Nicholas.

Political career
A member of the Whig party who was identified as an Antimason, in 1833 Penrose was elected to the Pennsylvania Senate.  He was reelected to a second term and served as Speaker of the Senate in 1838 and 1841.

In 1841 Penrose was appointed Solicitor of the Treasury in the William Henry Harrison administration. In March 1849 he was appointed the first Assistant Secretary of the Treasury, serving under William Morris Meredith.

After leaving his Treasury position during the Zachary Taylor administration in 1849 Penrose relocated to Philadelphia, where he continued to practice law.

In 1856 Penrose was again elected to the Pennsylvania Senate, this time as a Republican, and he served until his death.

During his second tenure in the State Senate, Penrose was accused of using bribes to arrange the election of Simon Cameron to the United States Senate, but nothing was proved and he was not charged with wrongdoing.

Death and legacy

Penrose died of pneumonia in Harrisburg on April 6, 1857. He is buried at Laurel Hill Cemetery in Philadelphia. Another man of the same name, who died in 1875, is also buried at that same cemetery, and may be the commissary officer, Captain Charles B. Penrose, who accompanied President Abraham Lincoln as he toured City Point shortly before the fall of Richmond, Virginia.

Several of Penrose's grandsons became notable within their fields. His namesake Charles Bingham Penrose was a Philadelphia gynecologist who became widely known for his surgical skill. Boies Penrose became a U.S. Senator. Grandsons R.A.F. Penrose and Spencer Penrose also achieved distinction, the former for his geologic surveys and entrepreneurial activity in Texas, Arkansas and Colorado as well as founding of the Children's Hospital of Philadelphia, the latter for founding many mining and financial companies in Colorado as well as the Pike's Peak Chapter of the American Red Cross. The naturalist Spencer Fullerton Baird, first named curator and Secretary of the Smithsonian Institution, was his nephew.

References

1798 births
1857 deaths
Lawyers from Philadelphia
People from Carlisle, Pennsylvania
Pennsylvania Whigs
19th-century American politicians
Pennsylvania Republicans
Pennsylvania state senators
Pennsylvania lawyers
Presidency of William Henry Harrison
Presidency of John Tyler
United States Department of the Treasury officials
Deaths from pneumonia in Pennsylvania
Burials at Laurel Hill Cemetery (Philadelphia)